Bruno Spengler (born August 23, 1983) is an Alsatian-born Canadian racing driver, currently racing for the BMW factory/works team. Nicknamed 'The Secret Canadian', he won the 2012 DTM Drivers' Championship.

Career

Early career
Spengler was born near Strasbourg, France but moved with his parents to Saint-Hippolyte, Quebec, Canada, when he was 3. He went to school in Canada but continued to go back to France where he started competing in kart racing in 1995. Spengler continued karting in both France and Canada and then moved on to competing in the French Formula Renault. Eventually this led to him being signed by Mercedes-Benz motorsport and in 2003 he was racing for ASM in the Formula Three Euroseries.

DTM
From 2005 until the end of 2011, Spengler drove a Mercedes in the Deutsche Tourenwagen Masters in Germany. In 2005 he ran with Persson Motorsport and he convinced AMG directors to have an official car in 2006. That year he finished the 2006 season second behind his teammate and five times champion Bernd Schneider. He completed the 2007 season campaign once again in second place, this time behind Audi driver Mattias Ekström, despite Audi's mass pull-out in Barcelona.

In August 2007 he was mentioned in a possible move to the new Prodrive F1 team for 2008, and possibly for a drive with McLaren. Spengler was a leading candidate for an F1 driver's seat based on his performances and also it was thought to help drive up interest in North America for Formula 1. With Prodrive gone and Heikki Kovalainen signed for McLaren, this did not happen for 2008. While leading the DTM in points during the 2010 season, Spengler's name was again brought up as a possible candidate to drive in F1. Norbert Haug Mercedes motorsports director commented that if Spengler were to win the DTM championship he would earn a ride in F1. However, he lost the championship in the last few races to Paul di Resta who went on to drive for Force India in the next F1 season.

For the 2012 season, Spengler left Mercedes and joined BMW Team Schnitzer for the latter's return to DTM. Spengler had a strong season, coming into the last race at the Hockenheimring three points behind leader and Mercedes driver Gary Paffett. He overtook Paffett at the start and held on to win the race. With this victory, his fourth of the season, Spengler took the Driver's Championship by four points and helped Team Schnitzer to the Teams' Championship and BMW to the Manufacturers' Championship.

Formula E
Spengler became, alongside Beitske Visser, one of the test and reserve drivers for Andretti Autosport ahead of the 2018–19 Formula E season.

Racing record

Complete Formula 3 Euro Series results
(key)

† Driver did not finish the race, but was classified as he completed over 90% of the race distance.

Complete Deutsche Tourenwagen Masters results
(key) (Races in bold indicate pole position) (Races in italics indicate fastest lap)

† Driver did not finish, but completed 75% of the race distance.

24 Hours of Daytona results

Complete IMSA SportsCar Championship results
(key) (Races in bold indicate pole position; races in italics indicate fastest lap)

Complete FIA World Endurance Championship results
(key) (Races in bold indicate pole position; races in italics indicate fastest lap)

† As Spengler was a guest driver he was ineligible to score points.

Complete 24 Hours of Le Mans results

References

External links

  
 

1983 births
Living people
People from Schiltigheim
Canadian people of French descent
Racing drivers from Quebec
Karting World Championship drivers
North American Formula Renault drivers
French Formula Renault 2.0 drivers
Formula Renault Eurocup drivers
German Formula Renault 2.0 drivers
Formula 3 Euro Series drivers
Deutsche Tourenwagen Masters drivers
Deutsche Tourenwagen Masters champions
24 Hours of Daytona drivers
WeatherTech SportsCar Championship drivers
Blancpain Endurance Series drivers
24 Hours of Le Mans drivers
24 Hours of Spa drivers
ART Grand Prix drivers
Sportspeople from Bas-Rhin
BMW M drivers
Mücke Motorsport drivers
HWA Team drivers
Racing Bart Mampaey drivers
Rahal Letterman Lanigan Racing drivers
Kolles Racing drivers
Schnitzer Motorsport drivers
Australian Endurance Championship drivers
Mercedes-AMG Motorsport drivers
Rowe Racing drivers
Graff Racing drivers
Jenzer Motorsport drivers
Nürburgring 24 Hours drivers